Ashley is an unincorporated community located in the towns of Guenther and Knowlton, in Marathon County, Wisconsin, United States.

Notes

Unincorporated communities in Marathon County, Wisconsin
Unincorporated communities in Wisconsin